was a Japanese actor. He appeared in more than seventy films from 1960 to 1993.　Before he started his acting career, he was a high school teacher but became an actor by Nagisa Oshima's recommendation.

In 1993, he died of Polyarteritis nodosa at the age of 62.

Selected filmography

Film
Taiyo no Sakaba (1960)
Night and Fog in Japan (1960) as Higashiura
Zatoichi and the Chess Expert (1965) as crippled yakuza
Violence at Noon (1966) as Genji
Japan's Longest Day (1967)
Double Suicide: Japanese Summer (1967)
Tales of the Ninja (Band of Ninja) (1967) (Voice)
Diary of a Shinjuku Thief (1968) as himself
Curse of the Blood (1968)
Death by Hanging (1968)
Kuroneko (1968) as a warlord
Yokai Monsters: Along with Ghosts (1969) - Narrator
Live Today, Die Tomorrow! (1970) as Gondo
The Ceremony (1971 film) (1971) as Sakurada Mamoru
Alleycat Rock: Crazy Riders '71 (1971)
Silence (1971) as The Interpreter
Female Convict Scorpion: Jailhouse 41 (1972)
Lone Wolf and Cub: Baby Cart in the Land of Demons (1973) as Oribe
Bodigaado Kiba: Hissatsu sankaku tobi (1973) as Karasaki Gen
Zero Woman: Red Handcuffs (1974)
Military Comfort Women (1974) as Yamagami
The Life of Chikuzan (1977) as Hikoichi
Sanada Yukimura no Bōryaku (1979) as Ono Harunaga
Edo Porn (1981)
Merry Christmas, Mr. Lawrence (1983)
Early Spring Story (1985)
Tree Without Leaves (1986)
Yearning (1993)

Television
Taiga drama
Akō Rōshi (1964) as Takebayashi Takashige
Taikoki (1965) as Hosokawa Fujitaka
Ten to Chi to (1969) as Suwa Yorishige
Kunitori Monogatari (1973) as Shimozuma Rairen
Katsu Kaishū (1974) as Takano Chōei
Kusa Moeru as Minamoto no Yukiie
Tokugawa Ieyasu as Hirate Masahide
Unmeitōge (1974) as Yami no Hichibei
Miyamoto Musashi (1985) as Sakai Tadatoshi
Sanada Taiheiki (1985-86) as Ninja Nakayama Nagatoshi

References

External links
 

1937 births
1993 deaths
Male actors from Osaka
20th-century Japanese male actors